This is a list of films which have placed number one at the weekend box office in Venezuela during 2011.

Highest-grossing films

References

 

2011 in Venezuela
2011
Venezuela